This is a list of notable individuals and events related to Turkmenistan in 2021.

Incumbents 
 President: Gurbanguly Berdimuhamedow
Assembly Speaker: Gülşat Mämmedowa
Deputy Prime Minister for Foreign Affairs: Rasit Meredow

Establishments

Disestablishments

Events

Ongoing
 COVID-19 pandemic in Turkmenistan

January

February
13: Turkmen President Gurbanguly Berdimuhamedov appointed his son, Serdar Berdimuhamedow, deputy prime minister, chairman of the Supreme Control Chamber, and a member of the State Security Council.

March

April
 26: Turkmenistan honors the nation's Alabay breed with a state holiday.

May

 25: The 140th anniversary of the city of Ashgabat was celebrated.

June

July

August
 7: Leaders of five Central Asian countries meet in Avaza to discuss on security issues in the region following recent gains made by Taliban during the crisis in Afghanistan.

September

October

November

December

Deaths

See also
 Outline of Turkmenistan
 Index of Turkmenistan-related articles
 List of Turkmenistan-related topics
 History of Turkmenistan

References

Notes

Citations

Further reading
 
 

2021 in Turkmenistan
2020s in Turkmenistan
Years of the 21st century in Turkmenistan
Turkmenistan
Turkmenistan